The following is a timeline of the history of the city of Amarillo, Texas, USA.

19th century

 1889 - Town of Amarillo incorporated.
 1890 - Population: 482.
 1892 - W. W. Wetsel becomes mayor.
 1899 - City of Amarillo incorporated.
 1900 - Population: 1,442.

20th century

 1905 - Amarillo Livestock Auction begins.
 1907 - Grand Opera House built.
 1909
 Amarillo News begins publication.
 Amarillo National Bank established.
 1910 - Population: 9,957.
 1914 - Amarillo Police Department formed.
 1915 - Panhandle Weekly newspaper begins publication.
 1918 - "Natural gas discovered."
 1921 - "Oil discovered."
 1924
 Amarillo Globe newspaper begins publication.
 Tri-State Fairgrounds open.
 1926
 Roman Catholic Diocese of Amarillo established.
 Amarillo Globe-News newspaper in publication.
 Herring Hotel built.
 1929
 Amarillo College established.
 English Field (airfield) begins operating.
 Temple B'nai Israel dedicated.
 1930
 Santa Fe Building (hi-rise) constructed.
 Population: 43,132.
 1932
 Potter County Courthouse built.
 Paramount Theatre in business.
1935
 KGNC radio begins broadcasting.
 1939
 Amarillo US Post Office and Courthouse built.
 KFDA radio begins broadcasting.
 1942 - U.S. military Amarillo Army Air Field activated near city.
 1949 - Sunset Drive-In cinema in business.
 1953 - KFDA-TV and KGNC-TV (now KAMR-TV) (television) begin broadcasting.
 1954 - Texas State Highway Loop 279 in operation.
 1957 - KVII-TV (television) begins broadcasting.
 1960 - Population: 137,969.
 1966 - Amarillo City Transit established.
 1968
 U.S. military Amarillo Air Force Base closes.
 Amarillo Civic Center (convention center) opens (approximate date).
 Fox Theatre (cinema) in business.
 1971 - Chase Tower built.
 1972 - Amarillo Art Center established.
 1976 - Amarillo International Airport in operation.
 1982 - High Plains Food Bank organized.
 1982 - KJTV (now KCIT) ((television) begin broadcasting.
 1990 - Population: 157,571.
 1998 - February 10: Oprah Winfrey wins mad cow disease-related lawsuit brought by local ranchers.
 2000 - Amarillo National Center (arena) built.

21st century

 2006 - Globe-News Center for the Performing Arts opens.
 2010 - Population: 190,695.
 2011 - Paul Harpole becomes mayor.
 2017 - Xcel Energy opens a new building in downtown Amarillo Also a new downtown hotel was built along with a parking garage. Also Ginger Nelson was elected the 2nd female mayor in Amarillo.

See also
 Amarillo history
 List of mayors of Amarillo, Texas
 National Register of Historic Places listings in Potter County, Texas
 Timelines of other cities in the West Texas area of Texas: Abilene, El Paso, Lubbock, Midland

References

Bibliography

 
 
 
  + chronology
 Della Tyler Key. In the Cattle Country: History of Potter County, 1887–1966 (Amarillo: Tyler-Berkley, 1961; 2d ed., Wichita Falls: Nortex, 1972). 
 David L. Nail. One Short Sleep Past: A Profile of Amarillo in the Thirties (Canyon, Texas: Staked Plains, 1973).

External links

 
 
 

Amarillo, Texas
amarillo